RKN may refer to:

Redknee, a Canadian telecommunications company with the stock name RKN
The Mega Man Killers, antagonists from the Mega Man series
Roskomnadzor, Russian federal executive agency responsible for monitoring, controlling and censoring Russian mass media.